South Korea participated in the 2010 Asian Para Games, the first multi-sport event for athletes with a physical disability to run parallel to an edition of the Asian Games.

Medal summary

Medal table

Medalists

References
 2010 Asian Para Games official website

Asian Para Games
Nations at the 2010 Asian Para Games
South Korea at the Asian Para Games